Jack Sing (3 October 1924 – 31 May 2016) was an Australian rules footballer who played with Geelong in the Victorian Football League (VFL).

Notes

External links 

1924 births
Australian rules footballers from Victoria (Australia)
Geelong Football Club players
Geelong West Football Club players
2016 deaths